Ethelbert or Æthelberht is a masculine given name.

Ethelbert may also refer to:

 Ethelbert, Manitoba, Canada, a village
 Municipality of Ethelbert, Manitoba
 Rural Municipality of Ethelbert, Manitoba, a former municipality
 Ethelbert (electoral district), Manitoba, a former provincial electoral district
 Ethelbert Ridge, Alexander Island, Antarctica